Lindsay Lee-Waters (born June 28, 1977) is an American former professional tennis player.

Lee-Waters has a career-high WTA singles ranking of No. 33, achieved on 1 April 1996. She also has a career-high WTA doubles ranking of 85, achieved on 25 February 2013. Lee-Waters won 11 singles and 21 doubles titles on the ITF.

Her results on the WTA Tour include semifinals at the Bell Challenge 1995 and British Hard Court Championships, and Canberra International, as well as the quarterfinals of Indian Wells in 1996.

Personal life and career
Lindsay Lee married her coach Heath Waters on March 7, 2000. Heath Waters is the owner of Strive Tennis Academy in Atlanta. Lee-Waters gave birth to their daughter Sevyn on January 13, 2001, and later to their son Heath Paul on April 24, 2006. Born in Oklahoma City, Oklahoma to Ron and Pat, she currently resides with her family in Dunwoody, Georgia.

Lee-Waters started playing tennis at the age of eight at the suggestion of a spectator at her baseball game. When she was 15, she moved from Owasso, Oklahoma, to Atlanta, Georgia to train. Lee-Waters has an all-court style of play and her favorite surfaces are hardcourt and clay; favorite shot is the return.

In 2020, Lee-Waters and her husband Heath developed the Match Tennis App.

Awards and nominations
 1995 — WTA Most Impressive Newcomer (nominated)

Grand Slam performance timelines

Singles

Doubles

ITF Circuit finals

Singles: 23 (11 titles, 12 runner-ups)

Doubles: 47 (21 titles, 26 runner-ups)

References

External links
 
 

1977 births
American female tennis players
Living people
People from Dunwoody, Georgia
Sportspeople from DeKalb County, Georgia
Sportspeople from Oklahoma City
Tennis people from Georgia (U.S. state)
Tennis people from Oklahoma
21st-century American women